Martha Gabriela Araujo-Pardo is a Mexican mathematician specializing in graph theory, including work on graph coloring, Kneser graphs, cages, and finite geometry. She is a researcher at the National Autonomous University of Mexico in the Mathematics Institute, Juriquilla Campus, and the 2022–2024 president of the Mexican Mathematical Society.

Education and career
Araujo studied mathematics at the National Autonomous University of Mexico (UNAM), where she completed her Ph.D. in 2000. Her dissertation, Daisy Structure in Desarguesian Projective Planes, was supervised by Luis Montejano Peimbert. She has worked for the UNAM Mathematics Institute since 2000, with a postdoctoral research visit to the Polytechnic University of Catalonia in Spain.

She is president of the Mexican Mathematical Society for the 2022–2024 term.

Recognition
In 2013, Araujo won UNAM's Sor Juana Inés de la Cruz 2013 award, and was elected to the Mexican Academy of Sciences.

References

External links
Home page

Year of birth missing (living people)
Living people
Mexican mathematicians
Mexican women mathematicians
Graph theorists
National Autonomous University of Mexico alumni
Members of the Mexican Academy of Sciences